Josh Bartlett is a New Zealand rugby union player who plays for the  in Super Rugby and the  in the National Provincial Championship. His playing position is prop. He was named in the Chiefs squad for Round 14 of the 2022 Super Rugby Pacific season, and made his debut in the same fixture. Bartlett was also named in the  squad for the 2021 Bunnings NPC.

References

New Zealand rugby union players
Living people
Rugby union props
Bay of Plenty rugby union players
Chiefs (rugby union) players
Year of birth missing (living people)